Hommage a l'amour is a vinyl album by Ensemble Renaissance, released in 1990 on the PGP RTB label, Ensemble's seventh album overall and their last album recorded for PGP RTB. It is a compilation of the Medieval tunes from the various styles and manuscripts: songs from Carmina Burana, a rondeau by Adam de la Halles, trouvere and minnesang songs, Italian Trecento ballata by Francesco Landini, a virelai from Llibre Vermell de Montserrat in addition to the istampittas preserved in the manuscript kept under the number MS 29987 in the British Library. LP consists of two sides: Hommage a la printemps, a homage to spring, and Hommage a l'Amour, a homage to love.
The material from this LP will find its place on their German CDs Anthology  and Marco Polo – The Journey in a remastered form.

Track listing
All tracks produced by Ensemble Renaissance

Personnel
The following people contributed to the Hommage a l'Amour

Vojka Đorđević – soprano
Dragana Jugović del Monaco – mezzo-soprano
Dragan Mlađenović – tenor, šargija, bağlama, percussion instruments, vielle
Miroslav Marković – baritone
Georges Grujić – rauschpfeife, recorder, bass dulcian, gemshorn
Miomir Ristić – fiddle
Vladimir Ćirić – vielle, rebec
Zoran Kostadinovic – rebec
Slobodan Vujisić – oud
Svetislav Madžarević – šargija, percussion instruments
Dragan Karolić – recorder, transverse flute
Boris Bunjac – percussion instruments
Jovan Horvat – percussions

1990 albums
Ensemble Renaissance albums